Jaruwan Chaiyarak (born 23 April 1990) is a Thai footballer who plays as a forward for the Thailand women's national team.

International goals
Scores and results list Thailand's goal tally first.

References

1990 births
Living people
Women's association football forwards
Jaruwan Chaiyarak
Jaruwan Chaiyarak
Jaruwan Chaiyarak
Jaruwan Chaiyarak